Chuxiong City (Chuxiong Yi Script: , IPA：) is a county-level city and the capital of the Chuxiong Yi Autonomous Prefecture, in Central Yunnan Province, China.

Geography
Chuxiong City has a population of 130,000 inhabitants and the entire Chuxiong Prefecture has an estimated 2,542,530 inhabitants.

Lijiang is about a six-hour drive from Chuxiong, and Lugu Lake is about 11 hours north, on the Sichuan border.

Administrative divisions
Chuxiong City has 12 towns and 3 townships. 
12 towns

3 townships
 Shuju
 Daguokou
 Dadiji

Climate
Chuxiong experiences a mild dry-winter humid subtropical climate (Köppen climate classification: Cwa), bordering on a dry-winter subtropical highland climate (Köppen climate classification: Cwb). Winters are mild, dry and sunny, although average lows in January reach barely above freezing. Spring begins early and remains dry and sunny until late May, when there is a dramatic uptick in the frequency and amount of rainfall lasting until late September. Summers are warm, rainy and generally overcast, with June, the warmest month, averaging . Autumn sees an abrupt reduction in rainfall and a return to clear skies.

With monthly percent possible sunshine ranging from 28% in July to 70% in February, the city receives 2,177 hours of bright sunshine annually.

Ethnic groups

The Yi People 
Although the Yi People, Chuxiong's largest minority group, has the most historical presence in the area, the large majority of the population is now Han Chinese. The Yi people are still highly celebrated and maintain a large influence on the city's art and customs.

Chuxiong has two main Yi subgroups, namely Luoluopo  (who speak Central Yi language) and Luowu  (who speak Eastern Yi language) (Chuxiong City Gazetteer 1993:145). The two main Miao subgroups are White Miao  and Flowery Miao .

The city also has a large presence of Bai and Hui people.

Economy

Development Zone
Chuxiong Economic Development Zone
Chuxiong Economic Development Zone is an important zone in Yunnan. Now the zone has attracted a number of investment projects. It is an important industry for the development of new-type industry platform.

Attractions

 Yi Ren Gu Zhen ("Ancient Town of the Yi People") is an ancient town and tourist attraction in the northwestern "new town".  There is nightly dancing and music with people of the Yi People (who are one of China's 55 ethnic minorities).  The Yi people's authentic, hand-made garb can be purchased in this community, along with many other hand-made items.
 As of early 2007, the recently constructed Xin Long Jiang Guang Chang Mall features a Jack Jones clothing store, an Only clothing store, a Tissot retail store, and many other high-end items for sale.  These international commercial outlets were nonexistent prior to 2007, and are most likely a sign of the prosperity of the city due to its central location between three major tourist attractions in Yunnan (Kunming, Dali, and Lijiang).
 The Chuxiong 10-Month Solar Calendar Cultural Park was completed in 1999.

Transport
Chuxiong is served by the Guangtong-Dali Railway between Kunming and Dali.

References

External links
Chuxiong City Official Website
Chuxiong City Map

County-level divisions of Chuxiong Prefecture
Tourism in Yunnan
Cities in Yunnan